April 19th National Cemetery station is a station on the Ui LRT located in Ui-dong, Gangbuk-gu, Seoul. It opened on the 2 September 2017.

Station layout

Vicinity
Exit 1 : Duksung Women's University, Hyomun Middle/High School, Dobong Public Library, Seoul Baegun Elementary School
Exit 2 : to April 19th National Cemetery, Ui-Dong Community Service Center, Solbat Neighborhood Park

References

Seoul Metropolitan Subway stations
Railway stations opened in 2017
Metro stations in Gangbuk District